This is a timeline documenting events of Jazz in the year 2014.

Events

January 
 16 – The 9th Ice Music Festival started in Geilo, Norway (January 16 – 19).
 22 – The 3rd Bodø Jazz Open started in Bodø, Norway (January 22 – 26).

February
 5 – The 16th Polarjazz Festival started in Longyearbyen, Svalbard  (February 5 – 9).
 28 – The 10th Jakarta International Java Jazz Festival started in Jakarta, Indonesia (February 28 – March 2).

March

April
 11 – The 41st Vossajazz started in Voss, Norway (April 11 – 13).
 12
 Sigbjørn Apeland was awarded Vossajazzprisen 2014.
 Mats Eilertsen performed the commissioned work Rubicon for Vossajazz 2014.
 23 – The 20th SoddJazz started in Inderøy, Norway (April 23 – 27).
 25 – The 3rd Torino Jazz Festival started in Turin (April 25 – May 1).
 30 – The International Jazz Day.

May
 22 – The 42nd Nattjazz started in Bergen, Norway (May 22 – 31)

June
 26
 The 34th Montreal International Jazz Festival started in Montreal, Quebec, Canada (June 26 – July 6).
 The 26th Jazz Fest Wien started in Vienna, Austria (June 26 – July 11).

July
 2 – The 50th Kongsberg Jazzfestival started at Kongsberg, Norway (July 2 – 5).
 4
 The 36th Copenhagen Jazz Festival started in Copenhagen, Denmark (July 4 – 14).
 The 48th Montreux Jazz Festival started in Montreux, Switzerland (July 4 – 18).
 5 – Mathias Eick was recipient of the Kongsberg Jazz Award or DNB.prisen 2014 at the Kongsberg Jazzfestival.
 8 – The 67th Nice Jazz Festival started in Nice, France (July 8 – 12).
 10 – The 14th Stavernfestivalen started in Stavern, Norway (July 10 – 12).
 11 – The 39th North Sea Jazz Festival started in Rotterdam, Netherlands (July 11 – 13).
 12
 The 26th Aarhus Jazz Festival started in Aarhus, Denmark (July 12 – 19).
 The 49th Pori Jazz Festival started in Pori, Finland (July 12 – 20).
 14 – The 54th Moldejazz started in Molde, Norway with Sidsel Endresen as artist in residence (July 14 – 19).
 15 – Monkey Plot was awarded the JazzIntro 2014 at Moldejazz.
 22 – The 19th Canal Street started in Arendal, Norway (July 22 – 26).

August
 3 – The 58th Newport Jazz Festival started in Newport, Rhode Island (August 3 – 5).
6 – The 28th Sildajazz started in Haugesund, Norway (August 6–10).
7 – The 30th Brecon Jazz Festival started in Brecon, Wales (August 7 – 9).
11 – The 29th Oslo Jazzfestival started in Oslo, Norway (August 11–16).
 12 – Odd André Elveland was recipient of the Ella-prisen 2014 at the Oslo Jazzfestival.

September
 4 – The 10th Punktfestivalen started in Kristiansand, Norway (September 4 – 6).
 19 – The 57th Monterey Jazz Festival started in Monterey, California (September 19 – 21).

October
 10 – The 31st Stockholm Jazz Festival started in Stockholm, Sweden (October 10 – 19).

November
 14 – The 23rd London Jazz Festival started in London, England (November 14 – 23).

December

Album released

January

February

March

April

May

June

July

August

September

October

November

December

Unknown date
#

M
 Switch by Nils Petter Molvær (Okhe).

Deaths

January 
 1 – Sam Ulano, American drummer (born 1920).
 9
 Amiri Baraka, African-American writer and music critic (born 1934).
 Roy Campbell Jr., American trumpeter (born 1952).
 13 – Ronny Jordan, British guitarist (born 1962).
 15 – Aage Teigen, Norwegian trombonist (born 1944).
 18 – Billie Rogers, American trumpeter and singer (born 1917).
 23 – Riz Ortolani, Italian film composer (born 1926).
 25 – Arthur Doyle, American saxophonist, flutist, zanzithophonist, and vocalist (born 1924).
 27 – Pete Seeger, American guitarist (born 1919).

February 
 11 – Alice Babs, Swedish singer and actress (born 1924).
 24 – Franny Beecher, American guitarist (born 1921).
 25 – Paco de Lucía, Spanish virtuoso flamenco guitarist, composer and producer (born 1947).

March 
 13 – Al Harewood, American drummer (born 1923).

April 
 1 – King Fleming, American pianist and bandleader (born 1922).
 5
 Alan Davie, Scottish tenor saxophonist and painter (born 1920).
 Wayne Henderson, American soul jazz and hard bop trombonist and record producer (born 1939).
 12 – Fred Ho, American baritone saxophonist, composer, and bandleader (born 1957).
 14 – Armando Peraza, Cuban percussionist, Santana (born 1924).
 23 – Benjamín Brea, Spanish-Venezuelan saxophonist, flautist, and oboist (born 1946).
 24 – Konstantin Orbelyan, Armenian pianist, composer, and head of the State Estrada Orchestra of Armenia (born 1928).

May 
 4 – Earl Gill, Irish trumpeter and bandleader (born 1932).
 8 – Jair Rodrigues, Brazilian musician and singer (born 1939).
 9
 Frank Strazzeri, American pianist (born 1930).
 Joe Wilder, American trumpeter, bandleader, and composer (born 1922).
 25
 Edmund Percey, English architect and pianist (born 1929).
 Herb Jeffries, American singer and actor (born 1913).

June 
 5 – Aaron Sachs, American saxophonist and clarinetist (born 1923).
 12 – Jimmy Scott, American vocalist (born 1925).
 18 – Horace Silver, American pianist (born 1928).
 29 – Paul Horn, American jazz flautist and saxophonist (born 1930).

July 
 5 – Kathy Stobart, English saxophonist (born 1925).
 7 – Frankie Dunlop, American jazz drummer (born 1928).
 11 – Charlie Haden, American upright-bassist (born 1937).
 19 – Lionel Ferbos, American trumpeter (born 1911).
 29
 Giorgio Gaslini, Italian pianist, composer, and conductor (born 1929).
 Idris Muhammad, American drummer (born 1939).

August 
 3 – Kenny Drew Jr., American pianist (born 1958).
 15 – John Blake Jr., American violinist (born 1947).
 22 – John Ore, American bassist (born 1933).
 24 – Fred Sturm, American composer, arranger, and teacher (born 1951).
 27 – Roy Crimmins, English trombonist, composer, and arranger (born 1929).
 28 – Alan Lawrence Turnbull, Australian drummer (born 1943).

September 
 8 – Gerald Wilson, American trumpeter (born 1918).
 12 – Joe Sample, American pianist (born 1939).
 15 – Jackie Cain, American singer (born 1928).
 18 – Kenny Wheeler, Canadian composer, trumpeter, and flugelhorn player (born 1930).
 28 – Petr Skoumal, Czech pianist and composer (born 1938).
 30 – Sheila Tracy, British broadcaster, writer, trombonist, and singer (born 1934).

October 
 10 – Olav Dale, Norwegian saxophonist, composer and orchestra leader (born 1958).
 11
 Brian Lemon, British pianist (born 1937).
 Mats Rondin, Swedish cellist and conductor (born 1960).
 16 – Tim Hauser, American singer (born 1941).
 24 – Vic Ash, English saxophonist and clarinetist (born 1930).
 25 – Jack Bruce, Scottish bassist, composer and orchestra leader (born 1943).
 31 – Renato Sellani, Italian pianist and composer (born 1926).

November 
 2 – Acker Bilk, English clarinettist and vocalist (born 1929).
 12 – Carlos Emilio Morales, Cuban guitarist (born 1939).
 20 – Joe Bonner, American pianist (born 1948).

December 

 2 – Chris White, American upright bassist (born 1936).
 20 – Ronnie Bedford, American drummer and professor (born 1931).
 24 – Buddy DeFranco, American clarinetist (born 1923).
 26 – Al Belletto, American saxophonist and clarinetist (born 1928).
 30 – Jim Galloway, Scottish-Canadian clarinetist and saxophonist (born 1936).

See also

 List of 2014 albums
 List of years in jazz
 2010s in jazz
 2014 in music

References

External links 
 History Of Jazz Timeline: 2014 at All About Jazz

2010s in jazz
Jazz